Rolli is a surname. Notable people with the surname include:

Antonio Rolli (1643–1695), Italian painter
Giuseppe Rolli (1645–1727), Italian painter and engraver 
John Rolli, American college men's ice hockey coach
Paolo Rolli (1687–1765), Italian librettist and poet

See also
Rollin (name)